Echinotheridion is a genus of comb-footed spiders that was first described by Herbert Walter Levi in 1963.

Species
 it contains nine species, found in South America, with the exception of E. gibberosum, found on Madeira and the Canary Islands.:
Echinotheridion andresito Ramírez & González, 1999 – Brazil, Argentina
Echinotheridion cartum Levi, 1963 (type) – Brazil, Paraguay, Argentina
Echinotheridion elicolum Levi, 1963 – Venezuela
Echinotheridion gibberosum (Kulczyński, 1899) – Madeira, Canary Is.
Echinotheridion levii Ramírez & González, 1999 – Brazil
Echinotheridion lirum Marques & Buckup, 1989 – Brazil
Echinotheridion otlum Levi, 1963 – Ecuador
Echinotheridion urarum Buckup & Marques, 1989 – Brazil
Echinotheridion utibile (Keyserling, 1884) – Brazil

Formerly included:
E. pseudogibberosum (Schmidt, 1973) (Transferred to Tidarren)

See also
 List of Theridiidae species

References

Araneomorphae genera
Spiders of South America
Theridiidae